The Ja'fri are a biradari of Shaikhs found in the state of Uttar Pradesh in India. They take their name from Ja'far ibn Abi Talib, a cousin of the Islamic prophet Muhammad, who from his charitable activity was called Abul Masikin, the father of the poor in Arabic, who was their alleged ancestor. The Ja'fri Shaikh have no connection with the Jafri Sayyids, who claim descent from Jafar as-Sadiq.

The Ja'fri are a biradari of Shaikhs found in the state of Uttar Pradesh in India. They take their name from Ja'far ibn Abi Talib, brother of the 4th caliph Ali, a cousin of Muhammad, who from his charitable activity was called Abul Masikin, the father of the poor in Arabic, who was their alleged ancestor. The Ja'fri Shaikh have no connection with the Jafri Sayyids, who claim descent from Jafar as-Sadiq.[1]
[edit]
 Shaikh of Uttar Pradesh

References

Muslim communities of India
Muslim communities of Uttar Pradesh
Shaikh clans
Social groups of Uttar Pradesh